Hemant Soren (born 10 August 1975)  is an Indian politician from Jharkhand, who is currently the Chief Minister of Jharkhand. Previously, he had also served as the Chief Minister of Jharkhand from July 2013 to December 2014. He is also the president of the Jharkhand Mukti Morcha, a political party in Jharkhand. He represents Barhait constituency in the Jharkhand Legislative Assembly.

Early life
Soren was born in Nemara in Ramgarh district, Bihar (now in Jharkhand) to Roopi and Shibu Soren, former Chief Minister of Jharkhand and founder of Jharkhand Mukti Morcha. Hemant has two brothers and a sister. He is the third child of all the siblings, first was Durga Soren, sister Anjali Soren then himself followed by youngest brother Basant Soren who is also a MLA from Dumka constituency in Jharkhand. His educational qualification is Intermediate from Patna High School, Patna, Bihar. As per affidavit filed before Election Commission, Hemant enrolled in BIT Mesra, Ranchi in Mechanical Engineering, but dropped out.

Career
He was a member of Rajya Sabha from 24 June 2009 to 4 January 2010. He started his political career as Member of the Legislative Assembly (MLA) on 23 December 2009. Later on, he became Jharkhand deputy CM on 11 September 2010 till 8 January 2013.

Chief Minister (2013-2014)
He was sworn in as the Chief Minister of Jharkhand on 15 July 2013 with support from Congress and RJD after President's rule was removed from the state. He was again elected as the Chief Minister of Jharkhand in December 2019, and sworn in on 29 December.

Leader of Opposition (2015-2019)

Pathalgadi movement against tribal land law amendments

In 2016, the BJP government in Jharkhand tried amending the Chhota Nagpur Tenancy Act and the Santhal Pargana Tenancy Act which would allow owners and tenants of Adivasi land to use it for non-agricultural purposes and the other would allow transfer of Adivasi land for building roads, canals, educational institutions, hospitals, and other "government purposes". This led to huge protests in the state and Hemant had strongly protested against these amendments.

CM Raghubar Das had invited Hemant to the Global Investors Summit in 2017, but Hemant called the summit a "maha chintan shivir of land grabbers" and claimed that it is being organised to loot the land of Adivasis, Moolvasis and the farmers of the state.

The Raghubar Das ministry was seeking amendments to the Chhotanagpur Tenancy Act, 1908, and the Santhal Pargana Tenancy Act, 1949. These two original laws had safeguarded the rights of the tribal communities on their land. According to the existing laws the land transactions could only be done between the tribals. The new amendments gave the tribals the right to allow the government to make commercial use of the tribal land and to take the tribal land on lease. The proposed bill amending the existing law had been approved by the Jharkhand Legislative Assembly. The bills were sent to Murmu for approval in November 2016.

The tribal people had strongly objected to the proposed law. During the Pathalgardi rebellion, protests were held against the proposed amendments to the tenancy acts. In one incident the protests turned violent and the tribals abducted the security detail of BJP MP Karia Munda. Police responded with a violent crackdown on the tribals, that caused the death of a tribal man. Criminal cases were filed against more than 200 people including the tribal rights activist Father Stan Swamy. Murmu, was criticized for her soft stand on police aggression against tribals during the movement. Being a tribal herself, Murmu was expected to speak up to the government in support of the tribals but it did not happen, and instead she appealed to the Pathalgarhi agitation leaders to repose faith in the constitution.

Murmu had received total of 192 memorandums against the amendments in the bill. Then opposition leader Hemant Soren had said that the BJP government wanted to acquire tribal land through the two amendment Bills for the benefit of corporates. Opposition parties Jharkhand Mukti Morcha, the Congress, the Jharkhand Vikas Morcha and others had put intense pressure against the bill. On 24 May 2017, Murmu relented and refused to give assent to the bills and returned the bill to the state government along with the memorandums she had received. The bill was later withdrawn in August 2017.

In October 2017, Soren had demanded a CBI inquiry into the death of 11-year-old girl Santoshi Kumari who allegedly died of starvation in Simdega as the family was not given ration since July for not having Aadhaar number seeded to their bank account.  Soren also demanded action against Chief Secretary Rajbala Verma, who, he said, had passed an order through video conferencing to remove the names of the families having not linked their Ration Cards with their Aadhaar number.

He has been a vocal protester of the Direct Benefit Transfer in PDS and recently, voiced his concerns on how the scheme has caused tremendous suffering and injustice. In April 2018, a JMM delegation led by Hemant Soren and his father Shibu Soren met the Hon'ble President Ramnath Kovind registering a strong protest on the dilution of the SC/ST by the Supreme Court and proposed amendments to the LARR Bill by the Jharkhand government

In March 2018, Hemant Soren met Telangana Chief Minister K. Chandrasekhar Rao regarding a possible non-Congress and non-BJP front should be formed in the country. However, he also attended a dinner hosted by UPA Chaiperson Sonia Gandhi where the agenda was to discuss a broader front against the Bharatiya Janata Party (BJP) led National Democratic Alliance (NDA) ahead of the 2019 general elections.

He supports the call for banning liquor in Jharkhand on the footsteps of Bihar. In response to the entry of liquor retail outlets in the state, he said "Now government will open liquor outlets in villages, which will ultimately impact the lives of poor tribals in Jharkhand. I appeal to the rural residents of the state to not allow liquor outlets in their villages."  He added women's organizations would have to come forward to launch a struggle against government's liquor campaign.

Chief Minister (2019–present)
On 29 December 2019, following the victory of the JMM, INC, RJD coalition in 2019 Jharkhand Legislative Assembly election, Hemant Soren was sworn in as Chief Minister of Jharkhand alongside Congress leaders Alamgir Alam and Rameshwar Oraon, and lone RJD legislator Satyanand Bhokta.
The Election Commission has sent its opinion to Jharkhand Governor Ramesh Bais on a plea seeking that Chief Minister Hemant Soren be disqualified as an MLA for violating electoral law by extending a mining lease to himself.

Awards and honors 
Soren was awarded Champions of Change Award in 2019, for his exceptional work for Dumka and Barhait constituency in the state of Jharkhand. The award was conferred by Shri Pranab Mukherjee at Vigyan Bhavan New Delhi on 20 January 2020.

Personal life
Soren is married to Kalpana Soren and has two sons. He has an elder sister Anjali Soren and a younger brother Basant Soren. He is an ardent follower of Birsa Munda, the nineteenth century tribal warrior, and takes inspiration from his courage and valour. His father Shibu Soren is the key founder of Jharkhand Mukti Morcha.

References

 

1975 births
Living people
Santali people
Jharkhand Mukti Morcha politicians
Deputy chief ministers of Jharkhand
Rajya Sabha members from Jharkhand
Kendriya Vidyalaya alumni
People from Ramgarh district
Chief Ministers of Jharkhand
Jharkhand MLAs 2009–2014
Jharkhand MLAs 2014–2019
Leaders of the Opposition in Jharkhand